Dynastic cycle is an important political theory in Chinese history. According to this theory, each dynasty of China rises to a political, cultural, and economic peak and then, because of moral corruption, declines, loses the Mandate of Heaven, and falls, only to be replaced by a new dynasty. The cycle then repeats under a surface pattern of repetitive motifs.

It sees a continuity in Chinese history from early times to the present by looking at the succession of empires or dynasties, implying that there is little basic development or change in social or economic structures. John K. Fairbank expressed the doubts of many historians when he wrote that "the concept of the dynastic cycle... has been a major block to the understanding of the fundamental dynamics of Chinese history."

The cycle
The cycle appears as follows:

A new ruler founds a new dynasty, and gains the Mandate of Heaven.
China, under the new dynasty, achieves prosperity.
The population increases.
 Corruption becomes rampant in the imperial court, and the empire begins to enter decline and instability.
A natural disaster wipes out farm land. The disaster normally would not have been a problem; however, together with the corruption and overpopulation, it causes famine.
The famine causes the population to rebel and a civil war ensues.
The ruler loses the Mandate of Heaven.
The population decreases because of the violence.
China goes through a warring states period.
One state emerges victorious.
The state starts a new empire.
The empire gains the Mandate of Heaven.
(The cycle repeats itself.)

The Mandate of Heaven was the idea that the monarch was favored by Heaven to rule over China. The Mandate of Heaven explanation was championed by the Chinese philosopher Mencius during the Warring States period.

It has 3 main phases:
The first is the beginning of the dynasty.
The second is at the middle of the dynasty's life and is the peak of the dynasty.
The last period is the decline of the dynasty, both politically and economically, until it finally collapses.

Significance

Chinese history is traditionally represented in terms of dynastic cycles. Through its long history, the Chinese people have been ruled not by one dynasty, but by a succession of different dynasties. The first orthodox dynasty of China to be described in ancient historical records such as Records of the Grand Historian and Bamboo Annals is the Xia, which was succeeded by the Shang, although concrete existence of the Xia is yet to be archaeologically proven.

Among these dynasties the Han and Tang are often considered as particularly strong periods, although other dynasties are famous for cultural and other achievements (for instance, the Song dynasty is sometimes associated with rapid economic development). Han and Tang, as well as other long, stable dynasties, were followed by periods of disorder and the break-up of China into small regimes.

Out of disorder a leader eventually arose who unified the country and imposed strong central authority. For example, after the Han various dynasties ruled parts of China until Yang Jian reunited China under the Sui dynasty. The Sui set the scene for the long and prosperous Tang. After the fall of Tang, China again saw a period of political upheaval.

There is a famous Chinese proverb expressed in the 16th-century novel Romance of the Three Kingdoms that says "After a long split, a union will occur; after a long union, a split will occur". Each of these rulers would claim the Mandate of Heaven to legitimize their rule.

Although this well-known dynastic periodization of China is more or less based on traditional Sinocentric ideology, it also applies to non-native rulers who sought to gain the Mandate of Heaven. While most ruling dynasties in Chinese history were founded by ethnic Han, there were also dynasties established by non-Han peoples beyond the traditional border of China proper dominated by Han people. These include the Yuan founded by Mongols and the Qing founded by Manchus, who later conquered China proper and assumed the title of Emperor of China.

See also
 History of China
 Dynasties in Chinese history
 Mandate of Heaven 
 Social cycle theory
 Kyklos
 Sexagenary cycle
 Dialectic
 Cliodynamics
 Asabiyyah
 Strauss–Howe generational theory

References

Citations

Sources 

 Ching, Frank. Ancestors: 900 Years in the Life of a Chinese Family. New York: William Morrow and Company, 1974.
 Wills, John E. Mountain of Fame: Portraits in Chinese History. Princeton: Princeton University Press, 1994
 Ch 4, "Alien Rule and Dynastic Cycles",

External links
Secular Cycles and Millennial Trends

Cyclical theories
History of Imperial China